Frank Worth Elliott Jr. (December 2, 1924 – October 20, 1997) was a major general in the United States Air Force.  General Elliott served in World War II as the captain of a B-24 Liberator, commander of the 14th Strategic Aerospace Division, and commander of Chanute Air Force Base in Rantoul, Illinois.  Elliott also held the distinction of having piloted the SR-71 Blackbird.

During his military career, General Elliott was awarded several commendations.  Among them were the Air Force Distinguished Service Medal with one oak leaf cluster, the Legion of Merit with two oak leaf clusters, the Distinguished Flying Cross., and The Order of the Sword.

Following his retirement from the USAF in 1975, General Elliott resided in Rantoul, IL.  When Chanute AFB closed on September 30, 1993, General Elliott worked as an economic development consultant for the city and was instrumental in helping the city attract corporations to fill the vacuum left behind by the base closing.  Following his death, Rantoul National Aviation Center was formally renamed Frank Elliott Field.

References

1924 births
1997 deaths
United States Air Force generals
Recipients of the Distinguished Flying Cross (United States)
Recipients of the Air Force Distinguished Service Medal
Recipients of the Legion of Merit
Recipients of the Order of the Sword
Recipients of the Distinguished Service Order (Vietnam)
People from Statesville, North Carolina
People from Rantoul, Illinois
Military personnel from Illinois